Still Life with Guitar is the fourteenth studio album by Kevin Ayers. It was the final recording to feature guitarist Ollie Halsall, who died shortly after its release. Ayers would not record another album of new material for fifteen years.

Track listing
All tracks composed by Kevin Ayers; except where noted.
 "Feeling This Way" – 2:43
 "Something in Between" (Ayers, Mark Nevin) – 3:15
 "Thank You Very Much" – 3:18
 "There Goes Johnny" – 4:03
 "Ghost Train" (Ayers, Peter Halsall) – 4:27
 "I Don't Depend on You" – 3:36
 "When Your Parents Go to Sleep" – 4:46
 "M16" – 2:54
 "Don't Blame Them" – 1:53
 "Irene Goodnight" (Traditional; arranged by Ayers) – 3:29

Personnel

Musicians
 Kevin Ayers – guitar, vocals
 Ollie Halsall – acoustic guitar (tracks 5, 8-9), vibraphone (track 6)
 Mark E. Nevin – acoustic guitar (tracks 3-4, 7, 10)
 Mike Oldfield – guitar (track 6)
 B.J. Cole – pedal steel guitar (tracks 4, 7)
 Kevin Armstrong – guitar (tracks 1, 7)
 Stuart Bruce – synthesizer (track 8), backing vocals (track 6)
 Simon Clarke – Hammond organ (track 6)
 Graham Henderson – Hammond organ (track 7), piano (track 2), accordion (track 4, 10) 
 Anthony Moore – synthesizer (track 2), keyboards (tracks 3, 5)
 Danny Thompson – double bass (tracks 4-9)
 Richard Lee – double bass (track 10)
 Simon Edwards – guitarrón (track 3)
 Roy Dodds – drums (tracks 3-5, 7, 9-10)
 Gavin Harrison – drums (tracks 6, 8)
 Steve Monti – drums (track 1)
 Ben Darlow – backing vocals (track 6)

Technical
 Kevin Ayers – producer
 Dave Vatch – producer
 Ben Darlow – engineer
 Martin Mitchell – engineer
 Stuart Bruce – engineer
 Mathias Augustyniak, Michaël Amzalag – art direction, design, illustration
 Dan Salzmann – photography

References

1992 albums
Kevin Ayers albums
Albums produced by Kevin Ayers